Alisupi  is a ward in Gwanda District of Matabeleland South province in southern Zimbabwe.

Populated places in Matabeleland South Province
Wards of Zimbabwe
Gwanda District